Igor Claudinei Reis Souza (born 27 May 1979) is a Brazilian footballer.

Igor Souza previously played for Estrela da Amadora and Gil Vicente F.C. in the Portuguese Liga. He also played for Mughan and Ravan Baku in the Azerbaijan Premier League.

Azerbaijan statistics

References

1979 births
Living people
Brazilian footballers
C.F. Estrela da Amadora players
Gil Vicente F.C. players
Ravan Baku FC players
Association football forwards
CU Micaelense players
People from Jequié
Sportspeople from Bahia